William Firth Wells (c. 1886 - 9 September 1963) was an American scientist and sanitary engineer. In his early career, he pioneered techniques for the aquaculture of oysters and clams. He is best known for his work on airborne infections. Wells identified that tuberculosis could be transmitted through air via the nuclei of evaporated respiratory droplets, and developed the Wells curve to describe what happens to respiratory droplets after they have been expelled into the air.

Biography 
Wells was born c. 1886 in Boston, with a sister and two brothers. Wells served in the military during World War I.  He married Mildred Weeks, a physician, and had a son. 

Wells was chairman of the American Public Health Association's subcommittee on bacteriologic procedures in air analysis, and chairman of the American Society for Heating and Ventilation Engineers' subcommittee on air sanitation. In 1950, the American Public Health Association honored his 40 years of service.

In 1954, Wells' career moved to Baltimore, Maryland, where he was a research associate at Johns Hopkins University, conducted research at the Veterans Administration Hospital, and consulted on respiratory disease for the Veterans Administration. He and his family lived in a remote part of eastern Maryland. One of his colleagues, Richard L. Riley, described him as "an eccentric genius." 

In the late 1950s, Wells collapsed, paralyzed from the waist down. After his initial hospitalization, he was transferred to the VA Hospital in Baltimore where he was overseeing a long-term tuberculosis study. He experienced periods of psychosis but continued to advise on research when lucid. He died on September 9, 1963, at the age of 76.

Research

Aquaculture of oysters and clams 
Between 1920 and 1926, Wells pioneered aquaculture techniques to culture bivalves. Wells was experimenting with the recently-invented De Laval milk clarifier, and discovered microscopic oyster larvae in the denser portion of clarified seawater. One previous experimenter, William Keith Brooks, had developed a way to harvest oyster gametes, but the resulting oyster larvae starved to death before they grew large enough to be filtered out of the water. Because they were so small, any attempt to change the water (thus providing new food) would remove the larvae too. Wells's innovation was to use the clarifier to concentrate the larvae. He used Brooks' method to acquire gametes, and grew them to adulthood in clarified seawater. By adding fresh seawater each day, and then using the clarifier to concentrate the larvae, Wells was able to resupply their food without losing them.

With this technique, Wells was the first to successfully cultivate Mercenaria mercenaria clams in captivity. Wells also cultivated the oyster Crassostrea virginica, the mussel Mytilus edulis, the clams Mya arenaria and Spisula solidissima, and the scallop Argopecten irradians.

Other work on oysters included oyster purification with chlorination.

Airborne disease transmission 

Beginning in the 1930s, Wells' research examined respiratory disease transmission. German bacteriologist Carl Flügge in 1899 was the first to show that microorganisms in droplets expelled from the respiratory tract are a means of disease transmission. The term Flügge droplet was sometimes used for particles that are large enough to not completely dry out. Flügge's concept of droplets as primary source and vector for respiratory transmission of diseases prevailed into the 1930s until Wells differentiated between large and small droplets. Wells' major contribution was to show that the nuclei of evaporated droplets can remain in the air for long enough for others to breathe them in and become infected. He and his wife developed the Wells curve, which describes how the size of respiratory droplets influences their fate and thus their ability to transmit disease. With Richard L. Riley, he also developed the Wells-Riley equation "to express the mass balance of transmission factors under steady state conditions."

In 1935, Wells demonstrated that ultraviolet germicidal irradiation (UVGI), which had been used to kill microorganisms on surfaces and in liquids, could also be used to kill airborne infectious organisms. This experiment proved that he had been correct that droplet nuclei could be infectious, and also suggested a route for prevention. In 1935, Wells helped develop UVGI barriers for the Infants' and Children's Hospital in Boston, using cubicle-like rooms subjected to high-intensity UV light to reduce cross-contamination. From 1937 to 1941, Wells implemented a long-term study using upper-room UVGI, that is, UVGI which only sterilized the area above people's heads, allowing the room to be occupied at the time but relying on vertical ventilation to ensure the occupants breathe sterilized air. This study installed upper-room UVGI in suburban Philadelphia schools to prevent the spread of measles.

Wells first proposed the idea of airborne droplet nucleus transmission of tuberculosis in the 1930s. He demonstrated that rabbits could be infected with bovine TB through droplets. In 1954, Wells began a long-term experiment to demonstrate that tuberculosis could be transmitted through air. At the VA Hospital in Baltimore, collaborating with Riley, John Barnwell, and Cretyl C. Mills, he built a chamber for 150 guinea pigs to be exposed to air from infectious patients in a nearby TB ward. After two years, they found that an average of three guinea pigs a month were indeed infected. Although this was exactly the rate Wells had predicted, skeptics complained that other methods of transmission (such as the animals' food and water) had not been conclusively ruled out. A second long-term study was begun, this time with a second chamber for an additional 150 guinea pigs, whose air was sterilized with UVGI. The animals in the second room did not become ill, proving that the only transmission vector in the first room was the air from the tuberculosis ward. The study was completed in 1961, and published in 1962, though Wells did not see the final paper.

Wells' 1955 book Air Contagion and Air Hygiene has been described as the authoritative book on the subject and a "landmark monograph on air hygiene." It drew on 23 years of research.

Posthumous relevance to COVID-19 pandemic 
A major area of scientific inquiry during the COVID-19 pandemic was the disease's method of transmission, and especially the distinction between "droplet" transmission or "airborne" transmission, since different public health measures would be required depending on the transmission vector. Wells' work on droplet size and the airborne transmission of tuberculosis has been cited as important and influential research to support the identification of COVID-19 as airborne, even when particles exceeded 5 microns in size.

Major works 

 "On Air-Borne Infection." American Journal of Epidemiology. 20 (3): 611–618. 
 Airborne Contagion and Air Hygiene: An Ecological Study of Droplet Infections. Cambridge (MA): Harvard University Press; 1955.

References 

1963 deaths
20th-century American biologists
American epidemiologists